Mohamed El Amine Rahoui is an Algerian footballer who plays for French football team JS Suresnes. He plays primarily as a left midfielder.

Club career
In January 2013, Rahoui signed a six-month contract with Polish-club Lechia Gdańsk after spending two weeks on trial.

External links
 
 
 eurosport.fr profile
 dzfoot.com profile

References

1988 births
Living people
Algerian footballers
French footballers
Association football midfielders
Ekstraklasa players
Olympique Noisy-le-Sec players
Lechia Gdańsk players
Algerian expatriate sportspeople in Poland
Expatriate footballers in Poland
SA Mohammadia players
Footballers from Oran
IB Khémis El Khechna players
21st-century Algerian people